Asthenosoma dilatatum is a species of sea urchin of the family Echinothuriidae. Their armour is covered with spines. It is placed in the genus Asthenosoma and lives in the sea. Asthenosoma dilatatum was first scientifically described in 1934 by Ole Theodor Jensen Mortensen.

See also 
 Aspidodiadema tonsum
 Asterechinus elegans
 Asthenosoma ijimai

References 

dilatatum
Animals described in 1934
Taxa named by Ole Theodor Jensen Mortensen